Henry Glass may refer to:

Henry Glass (admiral) (1844–1908), Rear Admiral, U.S. Navy
Henry P. Glass (1911–2003), Austrian-born American architect and industrial designer

See also
Henry Glassie (born 1941), emeritus College Professor of Folklore at Indiana University Bloomington
Henry Glaß (born 1953), German ski jumper
Glass (surname)